"Mary Had a Little Boy" is a song recorded by German Eurodance group Snap!, released in December 1990 as the fourth and final single from their debut studio album, World Power (1990). The song reached number-one in Zimbabwe and on the RPM Dance/Urban chart in Canada. It's lyrics are based on the nineteenth century nursery rhyme, Mary Had a Little Lamb. The chorus includes the line "Mary had a little boy, little did she know; and everywhere that Mary went, the little boy was sure to go".

The song was re-recorded and included on their 2003 remix album The Cult of Snap! featuring Milky & 2NF.

Chart performance
"Mary Had a Little Boy" was quite successful on the charts on several continents, peaking at number-one in Zimbabwe and on the RPM Dance/Urban chart in Canada. In Europe, it peaked within the top 10 in Austria, Belgium, Finland, Germany, Ireland, the Netherlands, Spain, Sweden, Switzerland and the United Kingdom. In the latter, the single reached number eight in its third week on the UK Singles Chart, on December 16, 1990. It spent two weeks at that position. Additionally, it climbed into the top 20 in Italy, reaching number 19. In the US, "Mary Had a Little Boy" charted on the Billboard Dance Club Songs chart, peaking at number four. In New Zealand and Australia, it went to number 13 and 18.

Critical reception
AllMusic editor Andrew Hamilton constated that Penny Ford's "telling vocal and the story line" on the song make it "the most accessible cut" on the World Power album. Larry Flick from Billboard complimented it as a "fairly appealing hip-houser". Push from Melody Maker viewed it as "funky". Another editor, Andrew Smith described it as "pure European house", "on the acceptable, if rather bland". Pan-European magazine Music & Media declared it as an "irresistable,  [sic] nervous dance track based on a wicked, sticking tune." James Hamilton from Music Week called it a nursery rhyme paraphrasing singalong". Timmy Mallett reviewed the song for Smash Hits, commenting, "This is really good." He added, "It's the sort of record I'd dance to, but it does sound as though they're scraping the barrel by doing what is basically a nursery rhyme."

Music video
A music video was released to promote the single. Filmed at Westway Studios in London, it was directed by James Hudson and produced by Nick Verden for Radar Films. The video received heavy rotation on MTV Europe, and was later published on Snap!'s official YouTube channel in May 2011. As of December 2022, the music video had generated more than 6.5 million views.

Track listings
 7" single (Logic 113 831)
"Mary Had a Little Boy" (Radio Edit) - 3:41	
"Mary Had a Little Boy" (Radio Edit Instrumental) - 3:41	

 CD maxi (Logic 663 831)
"Mary Had a Little Boy" (Radio Edit) - 3:41
"Mary Had a Little Boy" (Club Edit) - 5:56
"Believe the Hype" (US Edit) - 6:25

 German Remix CD (Logic 613 852 ) 
"Mary Had a Little Boy" (12" Mix) - 8:12
"Mary Had a Little Boy" (Red Zone Mix) - 6:43
"Mary Had a Little Boy" (7" Radio Edit) - 3:55

Charts

Weekly charts

Year-end charts

See also
List of RPM number-one dance singles of 1991

Uses in other Media
Former professional tennis player, Yannick Noah recorded a single in 1991, called Saga Africa and the song uses a sample of "Mary Had a Little Boy".

References

1990 singles
1990 songs
English-language German songs
Logic Records singles
Number-one singles in Zimbabwe
Snap! songs